Shah Latif and His Message is a 1992 book written by GM Syed about the life of  sindhi Sufi poet Shah Abdul Latif Bhittai and his teachings. The book is originally published in sindhi language and later on it is translated by Prof. Egnert Azariah.

Syed depicts Latif "as a nationalist and patriotic poet because of his immense love and commitment to Sindh and its people." The author has given a simple and direct version of his poetry and his teachings and it doesn't only guide us to correctly understand the message of his enlightenments but also helps us to understand that lurking soil of sindh since the ancient times of indus valley civilization.

Summary

Chapters
The book contains 12 Chapters.

 Shah Latif and His Life Sketch
  Era and Political Environment of Shah Latif
  Shah Latif the National Poet of Sindh 
 The Sindh of Shah Latif's Imagination
 Shah Latif's Concept of Nationalism 
  Analysis of the Ideas of Shah Latif and Dr. Muhammad Iqbal 
  The Religious Ideas of Shah Latif 
 Important Features of Shah Latif's Poetry 
 The Message of Shah Latif for the Sindhis
 Political Ideas of Shah Abdul Latif 
 Our Responsibilities Toward Shah Latif 
  Some Selected Verses of Shah Latif From the Point of View of their Themes

See also
Shah Abdul Latif Bhittai
Shah Jo Risalo
GM Syed

References

Books about writers
 
Sufi poets
History of Sindh
Sindhi-language writers